Neel Mukherjee may refer to:

 Neel Mukherjee (actor), Bengali actor
 Neel Mukherjee (writer), Indian writer